Konstantin Vladilenovich Yemelyanov (born 28 March 1970) is a Russian professional football coach and a former player.

Coaching career
On 8 December 2019, he was appointed manager of Russian Premier League club FC Orenburg after working there as an assistant for the two previous seasons. On 22 May 2020, Orenburg announced that Yemelyanov's contract expired and will not be extended.

References

External links
 

1970 births
Sportspeople from Vladivostok
Living people
Soviet footballers
Association football defenders
Russian footballers
FC Luch Vladivostok players
Russian Premier League players
Russian football managers
FC Luch Vladivostok managers
FC SKA-Khabarovsk players
FC Irtysh Omsk players
FC Orenburg managers
Russian Premier League managers